The Rice Exporters Association of Pakistan (REAP) was established in 1988–89 under the patronage of the Ministry of Commerce, Ministry of Food, Agriculture and Livestock, and the Planning Division of the Government of Pakistan. REAP played a significant role in defining rice standards in Pakistan. Consequently, Pakistan Rice Standards were established in 1992 for the first time, with support of the Pakistan Standards Institution.

Governance 
The Managing Committee is divided into north ((11 members) and south (12 members) zones. In 1998–99, REAP membership became compulsory for all rice exporters.

Achievements 
REAP has 1900 members in the region and is the country's second largest business association. In 1988–89 REAP members exported over 2 million tons of rice. In 1992, REAP hosted countries from the Persian Gulf region to gather government buyers from Kuwait, Oman, UAE, Bahrain, Qatar and Saudi Arabia. During that period about 36,000 tons from private sector were exported. In 1996–97, while negotiating with the European Commission, REAP obtained abatement in import duties of 250 ECU/ton for Super and/or Kernel Basmati Brown rice. Pakistan has market share of 60,000 tons out of a total market size of about 120,000 tons of Basmati rice.

Other activities 
REAP organizes seminars and training workshops to educate growers, millers and traders the latest techniques, bottlenecks faced and how to solve problems like the control of Khapra beetle on rice crops.

Pakistan’s rice exports grew 57 percent during financial year 2009–10. In 2009, REAP exported basmati rice at an average price of $825 per ton, down 33 percent compared with $1,102 per ton the preceding year. In 2010, Pakistan was exporting rice to 109 countries of the world.

In fiscal 2012, rice exports from Pakistan crossed 3.7 million tons, valued at $2.08 billion at an average price of $871 per ton for Basmati rice, and $448 per ton for non-Basmati rice.

Chairmen

Vice Chairmen

References

External links 
  

1988 establishments in Pakistan
Business organisations based in Pakistan
Rice production in Pakistan
Foreign trade of Pakistan